Jatun Urqu (Quechua jatun big, urqu mountain, "big mountain", also spelled Jatun Orkho, Jatún Orkho) is a mountain in the Bolivian Andes which reaches a height of approximately . It is located in the Cochabamba Department, Mizque Province, Vila Vila Municipality. Jatun Urqu lies south of Tikrasqa and southwest of Iskay Ch'utu.

References 

Mountains of Cochabamba Department